Kamenka is an urban-type settlement in Vichugsky District, Ivanovo Oblast, Russia. Population:

References

Notes

Sources

Urban-type settlements in Ivanovo Oblast